William J. Baroody Jr. (November 5, 1937 – June 8, 1996) was an American government official best known for running the White House Office of Public Liaison under President Gerald Ford and, later, the American Enterprise Institute (AEI). His leadership of the think tank saw AEI enjoy new levels of political influence but was cut short by financial problems.

Government career 

Baroody joined the staffs of U.S. Representative Melvin Laird and of the House Appropriations Committee in 1961, and later served as an aide to Laird at the Pentagon from 1969 to 1973.

In 1973 Baroody moved over to the White House to take over for the recently resigned Charles Colson. He worked hard to dispel his office's reputation as the "office of dirty tricks" that had developed under Colson. He consolidated the varied interest group efforts of the Nixon administration into a single office, which incoming President Gerald R. Ford titled the Office of Public Liaison.

Baroody changed the tactics of the administration from strong-arming legislators to one of persuasion. "Under Baroody’s direction, the office incorporated outreach efforts with consumers and women that had been located elsewhere in the White House, and the overall staff grew to approximately thirty. At the core of its activities was an aggressive campaign of regional conferences that enabled the nation's first unelected president to tour the country in a campaign-like atmosphere and prepare the way for an eventual reelection campaign. In Washington, D.C., Baroody also coordinated an extensive series of White House briefings for group and association leaders on a variety of policy topics that brought together group leaders and administration policy-makers. "

Presidency of AEI 

Baroody's father, William J. Baroody Sr., had been president of the influential, right-leaning think tank since 1962. The younger Baroody became executive vice president of the institute in 1977 and president in 1978. Baroody Sr. died in 1980.

Baroody's tenure at the institute saw increasing growth. With the inauguration of President Ronald Reagan in 1981, many AEI scholars' ideas on deregulation, the Cold War, the culture war, constitutional law, and other issues achieved currency and a receptive audience. Many AEI scholars left the institute for government service, including Jeane Kirkpatrick, Robert Bork, and James C. Miller III. Baroody expanded AEI's activities, producing more publications and introducing new research areas. However, the Reagan administration saw the emergence of new think tanks such as the Heritage Foundation and competition for funding increased. Insiders lamented a pursuit of prestige, evidenced by Baroody's hiring of Ford as a distinguished fellow, at the expense of more ideological conservative scholars. Some donors were concerned about AEI's centrist trend and perceived loss of conservative principle.

With AEI on the verge of bankruptcy in June 1986, Baroody resigned and was replaced on an interim basis by the respected economist Paul McCracken.

Personal 

Baroody was born in Manchester, New Hampshire. He was a member of the Melkite Greek Catholic Church.

He was educated at Holy Cross College, he later served in the U.S. Navy. He was divorced from his wife, Mary, at the time of his death, and he had nine children and thirteen grandchildren.

Baroody's brothers include Michael Baroody, a corporate lobbyist, and Joseph Baroody, a former leader of the National Association of Arab Americans. Baroody died in 1996 in Alexandria, Virginia.

References

External links

|-

1937 births
1996 deaths
American Enterprise Institute
American Melkite Greek Catholics
American people of Lebanese descent
American political consultants
New Hampshire Republicans
Virginia Republicans